Christmas Stuff is the sixth studio album by English-Irish country singer Nathan Carter. It was released in Ireland on 8 December 2014 by Decca Records. The album peaked at number 8 on the Irish Albums Chart.

Track listing

Charts

Release history

References

2014 Christmas albums
Nathan Carter albums
Country Christmas albums